Rynn Berry (January 31, 1945 – January 9, 2014) was an American author on vegetarianism and veganism, as well as a pioneer in the animal rights and vegan movements. A frequent international lecturer, Berry's books have been translated into many languages, and he was locally and internationally known in the vegan community. He served on advisory board of the American Vegetarian Association.

Early life
Berry was born on January 31, 1945, in Honolulu, Hawaii, and grew up in Coconut Grove, Florida, where his mother and maternal siblings lived. He studied literature, archeology, and classics at the University of Pennsylvania, and ancient history and comparative religion at Columbia University.

He became vegetarian as a teenager and vegan at the age of 21. He became a rawfooder in 1994.

Professor Berry taught comparative literature at Baruch College and later culinary history at New School for Social Research in New York City.

Career
Berry's first book, The Vegetarians (later re-titled The New Vegetarians), was published in 1979.

His next book, Famous Vegetarians and Their Favorite Recipes: Lives and Lore from Buddha to the Beatles, is a collection of biographical sketches of famous people who were vegetarians at some point in their lives. Each chapter also contains an illustration of each of the famous vegetarians profiled, followed by some of their favorite recipes. For the Leonardo da Vinci chapter, he translated for the first time into English recipes from De Honesta Voluptate by Bartolomeo Platina. The first edition of the book was published in 1989 by Panjandrum Books. In 1995, Pythagorean Publishers released a revised edition with three additional chapters covering Mahavira, Plato and Socrates, and Swami Prabhupada. A review published in Vegetarian Times, considered Famous Vegetarians "scholarship at the end of a fork – and for writing it, he deserves an 'A'." In Religious Vegetarianism: From Hesiod to the Dalai Lama, Kerry S. Walters and Lisa Portmess said that Berry's book is "a twentieth-century parallel" to Howard Williams's classic The Ethics of Diet. In his book The Vegetarian Revolution, Giorgio Cerquetti recommended "everybody to read Rynn Berry's excellent book." It was translated into Italian, Chinese, Taiwanese, and Polish.

In 1998 he published his third book, Food for the Gods: Vegetarianism & the World's Religions, which consists of a collection of essays on world religions, accompanied by recipes and interviews with vegetarian representatives.

In 2004, Berry published his fourth book, Hitler: Neither Vegetarian Nor Animal Lover, with an introduction by Lantern Books's co-founder Martin Rowe. Richard H. Schwartz, founder of Jewish Veg, called it a "thoughtful and carefully documented book.

Berry also wrote the entry on the history of vegetarianism in America for the Oxford Encyclopedia of American Food and Drink (2004), edited by Andrew Smith, and he was commissioned to write seven entries for The Oxford Companion to Food and Drink in America (2007)

He was also a playwright who contributed a number of short plays about 'famous vegetarians in history'.

Berry was on the advisory boards of EarthSave, the American Vegetarian Association, and historical advisor to the North American Vegetarian Society. He was an honored member of the American Vegan Society Speakers Bureau, instructor at Victoria Moran's Main Street Academy. Berry also contributed to the animal rights movement in Brazil, where he frequently lectured both in English (with a translator) and in Portuguese.

Berry was a consistent vegan and primarily raw foodist after 1994, and he made a show of his all-raw diet at vegetarian gatherings, though he evidently deviated from this path constantly while touring New York City's vegetarian restaurants and sampling their vegan-friendly fare for each annual update of his fifth and last book, Vegan Guide to New York City.

He wrote a chapter on the history of the raw food movement for Becoming Raw: The Essential Guide to Raw Vegan Diets, principally written by Brenda Davis and Vesanto Melina.

Death and legacy 
Berry lived alone in an apartment in Prospect Park. He was an enthusiastic amateur runner, despite having asthma.

He was found collapsed and unconscious in jogging clothes in Prospect Park in the Prospect Heights section of Brooklyn, New York, on December 31, 2013, but not identified until January 7, 2014. The only clues in his pockets were "keys and an asthma inhaler". He never regained consciousness and died at 12:30 pm on January 9, 2014.

Martin Rowe, author and co-founder of Lantern Books, commented on Berry's death:
"Rynn's impact was literally incalculable, given how many met him, bought his books, or talked with him at the Union Square green market over the many years. He was the epitome of the kind of unheralded grassroots activist without which any movement for change cannot grow, and he was a witty and erudite figure: the Dr. Johnson of the vegetarian movement. He would be missed greatly, even by those who never met him, but his work will live on."

Author Chef Fran Costigan wrote that Berry was "a gentle soul whose life touched so many."

His life was celebrated publicly and outdoors on March 30, 2014, for about thirty minutes, at the annual Veggie Pride Parade in New York City. On July 5, 2014, he was honored at the annual NAVS Vegetarian Summerfest in Johnstown, Pennsylvania, in a plenary led by vegan activist and author Victoria Moran. In previous years, Berry had been on the staff of Vegetarian Summerfest as a scholar and speaker on veganism and world religions.

Bibliography of published writings 

 The Vegetarians, Autumn Press, 1979. 
 The New Vegetarians (updated edition of his previous book, with William Shurtleff interview instead of Marty Feldman's), Chestnut Ridge, New York, Townhouse Press, 1988 ; Pythagorean Publishers, 1993. 
 Famous Vegetarians and Their Favorite Recipes: Lives and Lore from Buddha to the Beatles, Pythagorean Publishers, 1993; Eight Printing (Revised: 2003). 
 Food for the Gods: Vegetarianism & the World's Religions, Pythagorean Publishers, 1998. 
 Hitler: Neither Vegetarian Nor Animal Lover (with an introduction by Martin Rowe) Pythagorean Publishers, 2004. 
 "Veganism," article in The Oxford Companion to American Food and Drink, Oxford University Press, 2007, pp. 604–605.
 Becoming Raw: The Essential Guide to Raw Vegan Diets (with Brenda Davis & Vesanto Melina), Book Publishing Company, 2010. 
 The Vegan Guide to New York City (with Chris A. Suzuki & Barry Litsky), Ethical Living, 2013 (20th edition).

See also
List of vegetarians

References

External links
 A Tribute to Rynn Berry Jr. on the North American Vegetarian Society (NAVS) magazine, by Mark Mathew Braunstein
 Guide to the Rynn Berry Jr. Papers 1896-2016

1945 births
2014 deaths
American animal rights activists
American biographers
American food writers
American historians
American male biographers
Historians of vegetarianism
American veganism activists
American vegetarianism activists
Raw foodists
Writers from Florida
Writers from Hawaii
Writers from New York (state)
Writers from Pennsylvania